Diamond Cut Productions is an American company founded by Craig Maier and Rick Carlson in 1986 with the aim of preserving many of the original test pressing recordings made at the Edison Laboratories during the 1920s.

Diamond Cut Productions is the author of the popular audio editing and restoration program "Diamond Cut Audio Restoration Tools". This includes DC8, DC Live Forensics, DCForensics8.x through DCForensics10.8x, and DC Audio Mentor, and DCArt10.8x.  Diamond Cut Productions is also a record label having 22 music albums in its catalog featuring mostly music from the 1920s and 1930s. Much emphasis has been placed by Diamond Cut Productions on the Unreleased Edison Laterals collection of test pressings archived at the Edison National Historic Site, in West Orange, NJ.

At present, Craig Maier and Rick Carlson remain the primary contributors to the company which now also invokes major developments in the areas of record restoration, audio restoration, through the continued improvements in the audio restoration software used to preserve Edison's test-pressing lateral recordings.  Their company has expanded extensively into the field of Forensics Audio Enhancement and also including audio authentication and audio analysis which are widely used by various government agencies throughout the world.  They maintain a website located at www.diamondcut.com.

History
Diamond Cut Productions was originally a private archival venture by Craig Maier and Rick Carlson that begun in response to proposed budget cuts to the Edison National Historic Site in 1986.  At the time Kitta MacPherson of The Star Leger reported on the deteriorating condition of the Edison National Historic Site and its archives located in West Orange, New Jersey. Among the many artifacts lacking proper curatorial attention resulting from funding deficiencies was a collection of test-press recordings made by the Edison Company between 1927 through 1929 (their last few years in the record business).  Having read the disturbing article, R&D engineer Craig Maier and software engineer Rick Carlson offered to volunteer their time and technical expertise in the areas of audio hardware and software engineering in order to preserve the Edison Lateral Record collection of test pressings by transferring them to digital tape for  archival and preservation in the digital domain.

Diamond Cut Laboratory
Then Supervisor and Museum Curator, Dr. Edward Pershey, Ph.D. showed Craig and Rick the thousands of one-of-a-kind test recordings which were piled in stacks on a long row of tables on the second floor of the Edison main laboratory building. The total number of songs which were recorded numbered over 1200 with anywhere from two to five takes each, increasing the possibility of finding some truly important music that had remained unheard since the late 1920s. Following several meetings an informal agreement was made such that private funding could be sourced to construct the audio restoration laboratory required for the project. After seven months, enough funding was sourced to construct an audio in addition to designing and constructing several pieces of custom equipment required for the project.

With the laboratory up and ready, Mr. Tom Owens of the Rodgers and Hammerstein musical library in New York City was hired for his expertise in the area of archival audio transferring. Mr. Owens provided constructive criticism regarding the sound laboratory allowing them to improve upon their initial system. One significant problem which he had highlighted was that of establishing the correct turnover frequency for the transfer of the lateral test pressings. Documentation could not be found at the Edison site regarding the specifics of this important parameter, instead Craig and Rick had to devise and conduct experiments.  This experimentation involved a "high-end" vacuum tube based Edison phonograph designed around the same time period as the test pressings in order to deduce the correct turnover frequency. The experiments proved useful allowing various modifications to be made to their magnetic phonograph pre-amplifier in order to provide the most likely proper turnover frequency for the transfers consistent with their era.

With the laboratory and equipment in place, a seven year pro-bono contract was drawn up between the Edison National Historic Site / U.S. Department of the Interior, Rick Carlson and Craig Maier for the purposes of executing the archival project.  Nearly one full year had lapsed before the first record was transferred to digital tape.  Shortly thereafter, the sound lab was rebuilt in Rockaway Township, NJ where the lion's share of the transfer project took place over the next seven years.

After transferring around 900 of the recordings (times 2 - 5 takes per song, about 2,200 transfers in total) Craig and Rick decided that the music was not doing much good sitting in the underground vault of a museum. It was decided to release some of this previously unreleased material (only around 200 of the songs had ever been released in the Edison lateral format). At the time it worked out to be significantly easier to form a company and release these songs under a new record label. Thus Diamond Cut Productions was formed in 1992 through Craig Maier and Rick Carlson providing their own seed capital for the venture.

Test pressing releases onto CD

1992
The first release was titled "Unreleased Edison Laterals 1”.  This CD was an anthology of Edison Needle type records which had undergone complex analogue audio restoration techniques.  The album was of such a success in the market that another project was able to be started in 1994.

1994
The second release titled "The California Ramblers, Edison Laterals 2." This project saw improvements on the audio restoration process which had been used on the previous release. Instead of analog signal processing, digital signal processing utilizing their own algorithms to remove crackle, ticks, pops and hiss from the original material were employed. This new process (which ran on an inexpensive pc) was named Diamond Cut Audio restoration tools or DC-Art for short. The digital signal processing technique proved so successful to the extent that the Smithsonian Institution Press employed Diamond Cut Productions to perform audio restoration for some of their American Songwriter Series of CD releases.

1995
Although no Edison recordings were released in this year, worked continued on improving the restoration software used for restoration of the many Edison recordings.  During this time it was decided to make Diamond Cut Audio Restoration Tools (DC-Art16) available to other groups and the public with the focus on record archival and restoration.

1996
The third CD release was entitled "Hot Dance of the Roaring 20's, Edison Laterals 3" and was again processed utilizing Craig and Rick’s own audio restoration program.  It was soon realized the digital audio restoration was superior and all analog processing equipment had been abandoned. In parallel with these efforts Craig worked with County Records to produce and release an Edison olde tyme group on CD called "Ernest Stoneman and his Dixie Mountaineers" using their audio restoration process.

2000
Since the early years, Craig and Rick have released numerous CDs from the Edison collections including "Vintage Vallee - Rudy Vallee and his Connecticut Yankees" which includes 23 of the earliest recordings made by this group in the late 1920s. In addition, other recordings released on the Diamond Cut Productions label include other artists including "Early Eddy Duchin - 1932 to 1937."

Future (2022 on Forward)
In the future, Diamond Cut Productions expects to continue releasing more albums in various formats, outlets and venues within the Edison Lateral Cut series. However, they have also branched out into other musical venues from the 1920s and 1930s.  They are also continuing the development of their professional audio restoration and editing software product line and are up to DCForensics10.8x as of 2021.  Within their commercial software product line, they have released DCart10.8x during the third quarter of 2021 and also offer two VST plugins.

References

American record labels